This article presents a list of military occupations. Only military occupations since the customary laws of belligerent military occupation were first clarified and supplemented by the Hague Convention of 1907 are included In this article.

Military occupation is the effective military control by a power, including individual states or supranational organizations such as the United Nations, of a territory outside that power's sovereign territory.

Contemporary occupations

Historical occupations 
Events before the Hague Convention of 1907 are out of scope.

1907–1919 (miscellaneous)

World War I and immediate aftermath

1920–1946 (miscellaneous)

World War II: build up and immediate aftermath

1947–1959

1960–1979

1980–1999

2000–2019

2020–present

See also 

 Israeli-occupied territories
 Military occupations by the Soviet Union
 Peacekeeping – military deployments for peace-keeping purposes
 List of military and civilian missions of the European Union
 Annexation
 Revanchism
 For a list of states that have seceded unilaterally see List of states with limited recognition
 For a list of cases where territory is disputed between countries, see List of territorial disputes

Bibliography

Footnotes and references 

 Footnotes

 References

 
Occupations
Occupations
Military occupations
Military operations other than war